Meigs Township, Ohio may refer to:

Meigs Township, Adams County, Ohio
Meigs Township, Muskingum County, Ohio

Ohio township disambiguation pages